Rimbaud is an album by John Zorn. The album was released on Zorn's own label Tzadik Records in August 2012. It was dedicated to French poet Arthur Rimbaud.

Reception

Allmusic said  "The album is a non-negotiable must-have for the composer's fans and offers a suggestion of his terrific versatility for anyone interested in sampling his work". Martin Schray called it "a collection of four stylistically very diverse pieces".

Track listing

Personnel
 John Zorn − samples, electronics, alto saxophone, piano, organ, guitar, drums, Foley effects
 Trevor Dunn − bass
 Brad Lubman − conductor
 Ikue Mori − laptop, electronics
 Kenny Wollesen − drums
 Mathieu Amalric − voice
 Steve Beck − piano
 Erik Carlson − violin
 Stephen Gosling − piano
 Chris Gross − cello
 Al Lipowski − vibraphone
 Rane Moore − clarinet
 Tara O'Connor − flute
 Elizabeth Weisser − viola

References

2012 albums
John Zorn albums
Albums produced by John Zorn
Tzadik Records albums
Cultural depictions of Arthur Rimbaud